Bernhard Muhr (born 17 March 1977) is an Austrian football manager and former footballer who played as a defender.

He was last manager of SV Peggau.

External links
 

1977 births
Living people
Austrian footballers
LASK players
DSV Leoben players
SC Rheindorf Altach players
Association football defenders